Abdul Majeed Khan Khanan Khail (born 25 December 1963) is a Pakistani politician who had been a member of the National Assembly of Pakistan, from 2008 to 2013 and from June 2013 to May 2018.

Early life and education
He was born on 25 December 1963.

He has a bachelor's degree.

Political career
He ran for the seat of the National Assembly of Pakistan as a candidate of Pakistan Muslim League (N) (PML-N) from Constituency NA-73 (Bhakkar-I) in 2002 Pakistani general election, but was unsuccessful. He received 60,548 votes and lost the seat to Sana Ullah Khan.

He was elected to the National Assembly as an independent candidate from Constituency NA-73 (Bhakkar-I) in 2008 Pakistani general election. He received 83,850 votes and defeated Sana Ullah Khan. He then re-joined PML-N.

He was re-elected to the National Assembly as a candidate of PML-N from Constituency NA-73 (Bhakkar-I) in 2013 Pakistani general election. He received 97,688 votes and defeated Sana Ullah Khan.

References

Living people
Pakistan Muslim League (N) politicians
Punjabi people
Pakistani MNAs 2013–2018
1963 births
Pakistani MNAs 2008–2013